Martos is a city in the province of Jaén in the autonomous community of Andalusia in south-central Spain.

It has a population of 24271 inhabitants, making Martos the fifth largest municipality in the province.  The city is located on a western peak of the Sierra Jabalcuz mountain range.
It belongs to the metropolitan Area of Jaén, of which it is considered to be the second most important city after the capital.

Its economy is based on agriculture, in particular the cultivation of the olive tree. Also important are various industries, especially those related to the treatment of plastic.

History 
The city has been linked to the Roman settlement of Colonia Augusta Gemella, and starting in the 8th century was ruled by the Moors under various Islamic states for over 500 years. 
 
In 1225, King Ferdinand III of Castile and Leon captured the city from the Moors and incorporated it into his kingdom.

During the Middle Ages, Martos became a strategic place, and its defences were reinforced with the construction of numerous fortifications in the city.

At the end of the 19th century and beginning of the 20th century, Martos underwent significant economic and urban development (reflected in the city's architecture), in large part due to the wealth derived from the industrial production of olive oil. Martos thus became one of the most prosperous cities of eastern Andalusia.

Ecclesiastical history

Former diocese of Tucci 
Around 250 AD, a bishopric was established in present Martos under the name Tucci, on territory from the suppressed Diocese of Iliturgi. It was a suffragan of the Metropolitan Roman Catholic Archdiocese of Sevilla.
 
In 350, it lost territory to establish the Diocese of Cástulo (now also a titular see), which it regained at that bishopric's suppression around 400.

In 715, it was suppressed to establish the Diocese of Beaza.

Recorded bishops are
 Rogato (675? – 688?)
 Teudisclo (693? – ?)

Economy 
Olives still play an important part in the local economy, but industry an increasingly big part as well, including plastics, the auto industry, metallurgy, the construction of roads, etc. Many local firms support French multinational Valeo’s local production.

Festivals 
Among the numerous festivals carried out in the city it is necessary to highlight:
Holy week: Considered of tourist interest of Andalusia.
San Bartolomé's festival: Principal festival. August
Carnival 
San Amador: On May 5 
Virgin of the Villa: On the first Tuesday after Holy Week 
Saint Martha: On July 29 
Romería of the Virgin of the Victory: last weekend of May 
Festival of the olive: on December 8

Sports 
The most important club is Martos CD.

References

 "Martos". Encyclopædia Britannica. Retrieved June 22, 2005.

Sources and external links

 WikiSatellite view of Martos at WikiMapia
 GigaCatolic former and titular see of Tucci

Municipalities in the Province of Jaén (Spain)